Eric Hicks (born November 27, 1983 in Greensboro, North Carolina) is an American professional basketball player. Since graduating from the University of Cincinnati, he has played professionally for Telindus BC Oostende (Belgium), Polpak Swiecie (Poland), and CSK VVS Samara (Russia). He has also had two stints in the NBA Summer League with the Miami Heat and Boston Celtics, but has not played a regular season game in the NBA. Among the highlights of his European career are a 2007 Belgian league championship and an appearance in the 2008 Polish league All-Star Game. Now he plays for Leite Río Breogán from Liga LEB.

Football career

Cincinnati Commandos
In 2012, Hicks was granted his chance to play football for the first time since he was a sophomore in high school. He suited up for the Cincinnati Commandos of the United Indoor Football League as a wide receiver.

Notes

1983 births
Living people
American expatriate basketball people in Belgium
American expatriate basketball people in Poland
American expatriate basketball people in Russia
American expatriate basketball people in Spain
American men's basketball players
BC Oostende players
CB Breogán players
Cincinnati Bearcats men's basketball players
Cincinnati Commandos players
Kauhajoen Karhu players
Universiade medalists in basketball
Universiade gold medalists for the United States
Medalists at the 2005 Summer Universiade